Sennecey-le-Grand is a commune in the Saône-et-Loire department in the region of Bourgogne-Franche-Comté in eastern France.

Second World War SAS memorial
On 4 September 1984 a war memorial was unveiled to commemorate the WW2 casualties of the Special Air Service. Listing all of those from British 1SAS and 2SAS, including those who fell at Sennecey-le-Grand on 4 September 1944, French 3SAS and 4SAS and Belgian 5SAS, it is the only memorial to all components of a British regiment to exist outside of the UK.

See also
Communes of the Saône-et-Loire department

References

Communes of Saône-et-Loire